Archie J. Milano (May 26, 1918 – August 12, 1991) was a professional American football player in the National Football League (NFL).  In 1945 he played in one game for the Detroit Lions.   He attended Saint Francis University in Loretto, Pennsylvania.

References

1918 births
1991 deaths
American football ends
Detroit Lions players
Saint Francis Red Flash football players
Sportspeople from Brooklyn
Players of American football from New York City